Julien Van Puymbroeck (born 18 August 1947) is a Belgian footballer. He played in one match for the Belgium national football team in 1969.

References

External links
 

1947 births
Living people
Belgian footballers
Belgium international footballers
Place of birth missing (living people)
Association football forwards